Collinsville Station is a pastoral lease that operates as a sheep station in South Australia. It is composed of flat and hilly terrain with areas of saltbush and mallee scrub along with bluebush plains.

Collinsville Station is best known as a merino stud, and historically, has been responsible for about one third of the genetics in the Australian sheep flock.

The property was originally established by John Collins in 1889, and later named Collinsville and established as a sheep stud in 1895 with ewes from Koonana.

The Handbury family had purchased the property in 1995 from receivers for 7 million. Collinsville grew 30% in size under the management of the Handburys. Following flooding in the creek in 2011 bones of diprotodon were found on the property. The fossils were taken to the South Australian Museum, who sent a team of scientists to the site where a full adult skeleton was found nearby.

The Handbury family put the station on the market to be auctioned in 2013, at which time the  property was expected to fetch over 5 million. It was to be sold without the flock of 5,000 sheep it was stocked with at the time, which were relocated to the Handbury's Arcoona property.

See also
List of ranches and stations

References

 
Pastoral leases in South Australia 
Stations (Australian agriculture)
1889 establishments in Australia